Hussainganj is a Village and Town of Fatehpur district in the state of Uttar Pradesh, India.

Villages in Fatehpur district